Elsie Sigel (1889 – ca. June 1909) was a granddaughter of General Franz Sigel, and the victim of a notorious murder at the age of 19 in New York City in 1909.

Sigel, who had been a missionary in Chinatown, was found strangled inside a trunk on 18 June 1909 in the apartment of the prime suspect, a Chinese man named "William" Leon Ling, a waiter in a Chinese restaurant. Sigel had been missing since June 9, when she was last seen leaving her parents' apartment to visit her grandmother.

Background

Sigel's mother taught a Chinese Sunday school class in St. Andrew's Church at 127th Street and Fifth Avenue, while Sigel did missionary work at the Chinatown Rescue Settlement and Recreation Room, reaching out to "American, English, German, French, Hebrew, Italian, [and] Bohemian" girls who had gotten involved with drugs and prostitution. Four years prior to the murder, Leon had kept a chop suey restaurant on Amsterdam Avenue, close to the Sigel home, and Sigel and her mother had first met Leon there during missionary rounds of the local Chinese restaurants.

Investigation
During the murder investigation, 35 love letters signed by Sigel were found in Leon's apartment, along with numerous letters from other women. It was speculated that the motive for murder might have been jealousy, as Chu Gain, manager of the Port Arthur Restaurant on Mott Street, was also found to be in possession of recent love letters from Sigel. Chu reported that he had recently received an anonymous letter threatening Sigel's life if they did not cut off their relationship. Leon was never apprehended, and the murder remains unsolved.

Aftermath
Sigel's murder gained widespread notoriety due to the inter-racial aspects of the relationship as well as the fame of her grandfather, Franz Sigel, who was a U.S. Civil War general. The murder set off a wave of anti-Chinese hysteria, as well as suggestions that the murder was Sigel's own fault. The murder became the subject of a play, The Chinatown Trunk Mystery, which was performed around the country.

See also
List of solved missing person cases
List of unsolved murders

References

Bibliography

External links

 
 
 
 
 
 
 

1889 births
1900s missing person cases
1909 deaths
1909 murders in the United States
19th-century American people
19th-century American women
20th-century American people
20th-century American women
American murder victims
American people of German descent
Deaths by strangulation in the United States
Female murder victims
Formerly missing people
Missing person cases in New York City
People murdered in New York City
Unsolved murders in the United States
History of women in New York City
Women in New York City